Toxidia thyrrhus, the dusky grass-skipper or thyrrhus skipper, is a butterfly of the family Hesperiidae. It is endemic to Queensland, Australia.

The wingspan is about 25 mm.

The larvae feed on Cenchrus echinatus.

External links
Australian Insects
Australian Faunal Directory

Trapezitinae
Butterflies described in 1891
Butterflies of Australia